Marcel Rohner may refer to:

*Marcel Rohner (banker) (born 1964), Swiss businessman, former Chairman and CEO of UBS AG
Marcel Rohner (bobsledder) (born 1964), Swiss bobsledder